Rose Theatre may refer to:

Canada 
 Rose Theatre Brampton, a theatre in Brampton, Ontario

United Kingdom 
 The Rose (theatre), a historic theatre of Bankside, London, England, build in 1587 and now demolished
 Rose Theatre Kingston, a theatre in the Royal Borough of Kingston upon Thames, London, built in 2008
 Rose Theatre, a theatre in Edinburgh, Scotland, formerly the Charlotte Baptist Church

United States 
 Rose Theatre (Bastrop, Louisiana), a theatre on the National Register of Historic Places in Louisiana
 Rose Theatre, part of the Lincoln Center for the Performing Arts in New York City
 The Rose Blumkin Performing Arts Center in Omaha, Nebraska was known as "The Rose" for most of its existence.